This is a list of retired naval ships operated by the Philippine Navy and its predecessor, the Offshore Patrol. This list does not include ships transferred to the Philippine Navy for cannibalization of parts.

Philippine navy ships are prefixed BRP (Barko ng Republika ng Pilipinas), formerly RPS (Republic of the Philippines Ship).

Frigates

Destroyer Escorts

High Endurance Cutters

Corvettes

Patrol Craft Escort

Fleet Minesweepers

Patrol Vessels

Submarine Chasers 173'

Submarine Chasers 110'

Inshore Patrol Vessels

Patrol Craft Sweepers

Motor Gunboats

Fast Attack Crafts

Coastal Patrol Crafts

Mine Warfare Vessels

Coastal Minesweepers

Minesweepers

Amphibious Warfare Vessels

Landing Ship Tank

Landing Ship Medium

Landing Craft

Landing Craft / Ship Support (Large)

Auxiliary Ships

Hospital Ship

Supply Ship

Water Tanker

Tankers

Repair Ship

Lighthouse Tenders

Tug Boats

References

External links
Philippine Navy Official Web Site
AFP Armaments Upgrade Forum
Armed Forces of the Philippines Forum

Philippines
 
Decommisoned ships